Francis Bowes Sayre Jr. (January 17, 1915 – October 3, 2008) was Dean of the Washington National Cathedral in Washington, D.C., for 27 years. He was the first grandchild of President Woodrow Wilson.

He was a vocal opponent of segregation, poverty, McCarthyism, and the Vietnam War. In March 1965 he joined Martin Luther King Jr. on the voting-rights march from Selma to Montgomery, Alabama. Sayre was unafraid to denounce Senator Joseph McCarthy, Republican from Wisconsin, during the hey-day of the latter's influence in the 1950s. In 1954, Sayre called McCarthy a "pretended patriot", adding "There is a devilish indecision about any society that will permit an impostor like McCarthy to caper out front while the main army stands idly by."

Early life and education
Sayre was born in the White House in 1915, the first grandchild of President Woodrow Wilson. Sayre's father, Francis Bowes Sayre Sr., was a Harvard University law professor who later became an assistant secretary of state. His mother was President Wilson's daughter, Jessie Woodrow Wilson Sayre.

He graduated from Belmont Hill School and Williams College and received his divinity degree from the Union Theological Seminary. He was a chaplain in the Navy during World War II and later had a parish in Cleveland, Ohio.

Marriage
In 1946 he married Harriet Taft Hart (died 2003), daughter of Admiral Thomas C. Hart, They had 4 children.

Death
Sayre retired as Dean in 1978. He died three decades later, on October 3, 2008, aged 93, at his home on Martha's Vineyard from diabetes. His ashes were interred later that same month at the National Cathedral, where he had held the position of Dean and where he has been memorialized. He was survived by two daughters, two sons and eight grandchildren.

Awards and honors
Sayre was awarded permanent, honorary membership at The Guild of Carillonneurs in North America in 1964. The organization sought to recognize his work in overseeing the purchase and construction of the 53-bell carillon at Washington National Cathedral.

References

External links

1915 births
2008 deaths
Activists for African-American civil rights
American Episcopal priests
Religious leaders from Cleveland
People from Martha's Vineyard, Massachusetts
Military personnel from Washington, D.C.
Religious leaders from Washington, D.C.
United States Navy chaplains
Williams College alumni
Activists from Ohio
Woodrow Wilson family
20th-century American Episcopalians
20th-century American clergy
Burials at Washington National Cathedral